Clermont or de Clermont is the surname of:

 Andien de Clermont (died 1783), French painter
 Araminta de Clermont (born 1971), British photographer
 Gaston Clermont (1913–2005), Canadian politician and businessman
 Maurice Clermont (born 1944), Canadian politician
 Nicolas Clermont (1942–2001), French film producer
 Philippe de Clermont (1831–1921), French organic chemist
 Pierre Clermont (1941–2020), birth name of Pat Patterson (wrestler), Canadian–American wrestler and producer
 René Clermont (1921–1994), French stage and film actor and playwright
 Shannon and Shannade Clermont (born 1994), twin American models and television personalities

See also
 Abraham of Clermont (died c. 479), founder and abbot of the monastery of St.Cyriacus in Clermont-Ferrand, saint of the Syrian Orthodox Church
 Catherine of Clermont (died 1212/1213), Countess of Clermont-en-Beauvaisis in her own right and Countess of Blois by marriage
 Jean de Clermont (died 1356), Lord of Chantilly and of Beaumont, and Marshal of France
 Isabella of Clermont (c. 1424–1465), Queen of Naples
 Raoul I of Clermont (died 1191), French Count of Clermont-en-Beauvaisis
 Raoul II of Clermont (c. 1245–1302), Seigneur of Nesle in Picardy, Viscount of Châteaudun, Grand Chamberlain of France and Constable of France
 Tristan de Clermont (1380–c. 1432), Count of Copertino